Zvyagin is a Russian surname. Notable people with the surname include:

Ivan Zvyagin (born 1991), Russian footballer
Sergey Zvyagin (born 1971), Russian ice hockey player

See also
Zvyagintsev

Russian-language surnames